Carex fucata is a tussock-forming species of perennial sedge in the family Cyperaceae. It is native to Nepal and the central and eastern parts of the Himalayas.

See also
List of Carex species

References

fucata
Plants described in 1894
Taxa named by Charles Baron Clarke
Flora of Nepal